The Greyhound Half-Way House at 124 E. Main Street in Waverly, Tennessee, United States, is a building formerly operated by Greyhound Lines as a Greyhound Half-Way Station.

The "half-way" name reflected its role as a rest stop at the midpoint of a longer trip. In the Waverly's station's case, it is located at the approximate midpoint of U.S. Highway 70 between Nashville and Jackson in Tennessee.

The Waverly Half-Way site began operation in 1925. The preserved structure was built in 1938 or 1939.  Designed by William Nowland Van Powell the building is an example of Streamline Moderne architecture, and is faced with blue glazed tile.

It ceased to operate as a Greyhound station in 1973 and was partially boarded up and repainted at that time.  A nearly-identical building, a half-way station constructed in Flat River, Missouri, still stands but retains very little of its historic appearance, and now functions as a laundromat.

The Waverly Half-Way station was added to the National Register of Historic Places in 1999, and currently serves as offices for the Humphreys County Chamber of Commerce.

References

External links

 1943 Trip from Memphis to Louisville, Farm Security Administration, Office of Wartime Information,  Library of Congress Photo Series
 NRHP Application National Register of Historic Places

Bus stations on the National Register of Historic Places
Greyhound Lines
Transportation buildings and structures on the National Register of Historic Places in Tennessee
Transportation buildings and structures in Montgomery County, Alabama
Bus stations in the United States